Emilio Bautista Cachaza (4 February 1898 in Madrid – 2 January 1977) was a Spanish boxer who competed in the 1924 Summer Olympics. In 1924 he was eliminated in the second round of the featherweight class after losing his fight to Carlos Abarca of Chile.

References

External links
Emilio Bautista's profile at Sports Reference.com

1898 births
1977 deaths
Sportspeople from Madrid
Featherweight boxers
Olympic boxers of Spain
Boxers at the 1924 Summer Olympics
Spanish male boxers